Oakwood Cemetery is a large, city-owned burial ground in the East End of Richmond, Virginia. It holds over 48,000 graves, including many soldiers from the Civil War.

History
The City of Richmond purchased land in 1799 for the main purpose of establishing a municipal burying ground. The Shockoe Hill Cemetery was established on those grounds in 1820. When space became scarce  for new burials, the city responded by expanding the burying ground with the addition of 14 acres in 1850.
Five of those acres were added to the walled Shockoe Hill Cemetery for white interments, and the remainder was added to the portion of the burying ground there located outside of the walls, reserved for the interment of people of colour and the enslaved (that portion of the burying ground was established in 1816).  The city further responded by buying two tracts of land in what was then Henrico County in 1854, totaling . In early March 1855 the Committee on the Oakwood Cemetery and its Superintendent were ready to receive applications for interment of white persons who did not wish to buy a section, and for persons of color. In May 1855 it was reported that portion of ground intended for colored burials was ready, and a number of interments had already been made in it.  The Oakwood Cemetery Committee was a standing committee of the Richmond City Council.

In 1861, Richmond was named the capital of the new Confederate States of America. After the Civil War broke out, the city's hospitals and clinics received a large number of critically wounded soldiers. The City Council agreed to provide interment for soldiers who died in Richmond or Henrico County, and in July 1862 offered to have Oakwood Cemetery opened for large scale burial of Confederate soldiers, and set aside a separate section of the grounds for this purpose.

Oakwood Cemetery was set as the final resting place of soldiers who died in treatment at Chimborazo Hospital, a massive facility on Church Hill.

The United States Congress passed a resolution in 1866, a year after the war's end, providing for the creation of a system of national cemeteries for the interment of veterans and war dead. The resolution also called, controversially, for the removal of Union war dead and re-interment in the new national cemeteries.  The Richmond National Cemetery received the remains of 5,896 Union Soldiers from 09/01/1866 – 09/30/1867.  Of that number, 1,432 were re-interments of soldiers originally interred in Oakwood Cemetery.

Notable burials
 Ulric Dahlgren (1842–1864), Union Army Colonel
 Reddy Foster (1864–1908), MLB catcher for the New York Giants

See also
 Hollywood Cemetery (Richmond, Virginia)

References

External links
 
 Restore Oakwood
 Richmond Parks & Recreation Cemeteries List
 Stereograph of Confederate Graves April–June 1865
 Photographic Tour of Oakwood Cemetery
 Memorial Address May 10, 1916 by Dr. Douglas Southall Freeman
 List of Confederate Hospitals in Richmond, VA, during the Civil War
 
  

Cemeteries in Richmond, Virginia
Confederate States of America cemeteries
1854 establishments in Virginia